Coastal defence ships (sometimes called coastal battleships or coast defence ships) were warships built for the purpose of coastal defence, mostly during the period from 1860 to 1920. They were small, often cruiser-sized warships that sacrificed speed and range for armour and armament. They were usually attractive to nations that either could not afford full-sized battleships or could be satisfied by specially designed shallow-draft vessels capable of littoral operations close to their own shores. The Nordic countries and Thailand found them particularly appropriate for their island-dotted coastal waters. Some vessels had limited blue-water capabilities; others operated in rivers.

The coastal defence ships differed from earlier monitors by having a higher freeboard and usually possessing both higher speed and a secondary armament; some examples also mounted casemated guns (monitors' guns were almost always in turrets).  They varied in size from around 1,500 tons to 8,000 tons.

Their construction and appearance was often that of miniaturized pre-dreadnought battleships.  As such, they carried heavier armour than cruisers or gunboats of equivalent size, were typically equipped with a main armament of two or four heavy and several lighter guns in turrets or casemates, and could steam at a higher speed than most monitors. In service they were mainly used as movable coastal artillery rather than instruments of sea control or fleet engagements like the battleships operated by blue-water navies. Few of these ships saw combat in the First World War, though some did in the Second World War. The last were scrapped in the 1970s.

Navies with coastal defence ships serving as their main capital ships included those of Ecuador, Finland, Greece, the Netherlands, Norway, Portugal, Sweden, Thailand, and the British colonies of India and Victoria. Some nations which at one time or another built, bought, or otherwise acquired their own front-line capital ships, such as Argentina, Austria-Hungary, Brazil, China, Germany, Russia, and Spain, also deployed this type of warship, with Russia using three at the Battle of Tsushima in 1905.

Apart from specially built coastal defence ships, some navies used various obsolescent ships in this role. The Royal Navy deployed four s as guardships in the Humber at the start of the First World War. Such ships tended to be near the end of their service lives and while generally considered no longer fit for front-line service, they were still powerful enough for defensive duties in reserve situations.

Categorization
This type of vessel has always been categorized differently by different countries, due to treaties, differences in judgments related to design or intended roles, and also national pride. In the United Kingdom the Scandinavian ships were known as "coast defence ships". The Germans called these ships Küstenpanzerschiff ("coastal armoured ship"). The Danes referred to their ships as Kystforsvarsskib ("coast defence ship") and Panserskib ("armoured ship"). In Norway they were referred to as panserskip ("armoured ship"). The Dutch called their ships Kruiser ("cruiser"), Pantserschip ("armoured ship") or Slagschip ("battleship"). The Swedish term for these ships was initially 1:a klass Pansarbåt ("1st class armoured boat") and later Pansarskepp ("armoured ship"). Note however, that the German Panzerschiffen of the Deutschland class were not designed as coastal defense ships but as high seas raiders.

As an example of the profusion of terms and classifications which often contradicted each other, the 1938 edition of Jane's Fighting Ships lists the Swedish Pansarskepps of the Sverige class as battleships.

Swedish Pansarskepp
The Swedish Pansarskepp were an outgrowth of the earlier Swedish adoption of the monitor and were used for similar duties.

Technical details
They were designed for close in-shore work in the littoral zone of Scandinavia, and other countries with shallow coastal waters. The aim was to outgun any ocean-going warship of the same draft by a significant margin, making it a very dangerous opponent for a cruiser, and deadly to anything smaller. The limitations in speed and seaworthiness were a trade-off for the heavy armament carried. Vessels similar to the Swedish Pansarskepp were also built and operated by Denmark, Norway, and Finland, all of which had similar naval requirements.

Effectiveness
The Sverige-class ships differed in several ways from the classical coastal defence ship, having heavier armament as well as better speed and armor (while still being small enough to operate and hide in the archipelagos and shallow waters off Sweden). The main difference was to be noted in their tactical doctrine and operations. Unlike other coastal defence ships the Sverige class formed the core of a traditional open-sea battle group (Coastal Fleet), operating with cruisers, destroyers, torpedo boats, and air reconnaissance in conformance with traditional battleship tactics of the time.

This “mini-battle group” had no intention of challenging the great power navies in blue-water battles, but rather were to operate as a defensive shield to aggression challenging Swedish interests and territory. Based on the doctrine that one needs a battle group to challenge other battle groups, this force intended to form a problematic obstacle in the confined and shallow Baltic and Kattegat theatre, where traditional large warships would be limited to very predictable moving patterns exposing them to submarines, fast torpedo craft, and minefields. It has been suggested that the Sverige-class ships were one reason why Germany did not invade Sweden during World War II. Such speculation appeared in Warship Magazine Annual 1992 in the article "The Sverige Class Coastal Defence Ships," by Daniel G. Harris. This could be said to have been partly confirmed in the post war publication of German tactical orders, and of scenarios regarding attacking Sweden. The problems of maintaining an army in Sweden without sea superiority were emphasized, and the lack of available suitable units to face the Swedish navy was pointed out (“Stations for battle”, Insulander/Olsson, 2001). Summarizing the question of effectiveness for the Sverige class, it is likely that despite a good armament they would have been too small, slow, and cramped (from both a habitability and essential ship's stores standpoint), along with having insufficient range, to perform adequately against any traditional battlecruiser or battleship in a blue-water scenario; however, if correctly used in their home waters and in a defensive situation, they would probably have presented a major challenge for any aggressor.

Dutch Pantserschepen
The Dutch used their armoured ships mainly to defend their interests overseas, in particular their colonial possessions in the West Indies (the islands of the Netherlands Antilles) and the East Indies (primarily, modern Indonesia). For this reason the ships had to be capable of long-range cruising, providing artillery support during amphibious operations, and carrying the troops and equipment needed in these operations. At the same time, these ships had to be armed and armoured well enough to face contemporary armoured cruisers of the Imperial Japanese Navy (the Netherlands' most likely enemy in the Pacific), and as such they were expected to act as mini-battleships rather than strictly as coastal defence vessels.

The last Dutch pantserschip, HNLMS De Zeven Provinciën, was built in 1909 as a stop-gap measure while the Dutch Admiralty and government contemplated an ambitious fleet plan comprising a number of dreadnought battleships. This ambition was never realized due to the outbreak of the First World War. The Second World War put an end to a similar project to obtain fast capital ships in the late 1930s with German assistance.

Prior to the Second World War, the Dutch had relegated all the surviving pantserschepen to secondary duties. The Axis powers, who seized some of the ships following the conquest of the Netherlands, converted several of those ships to serve as floating anti-aircraft batteries and subsequently utilized some as block ships.

Operators
The navies of the following countries have operated coastal defence ships at some point in time.

Argentina
  (1874)
 El Plata
 Los Andes
  (1890)
 Independencia
 Libertad

Austria-Hungary

  (1895)

Brazil
 
 
 
 
 
 
  (1866)
 
 
  (1866)
 
 
  (1874)
  (1874)
 
 
  (1898)
  - Sold to Mexico in 1924

China
  (1888)

Denmark

  (1899)
 Herluf Trolle
 Olfert Fischer
 Peder Skram
 Niels Juel
 Skjold
 Iver Hvidfeldt
 Helgoland

Finland

  Panssarilaiva ships (1931)
 
  - transferred to Soviet Union as a reparations ship in 1947, served in Soviet Navy until 1966.

France
 
 Onondaga
 

 
 
 
 

 
 

 
 
 
  6,476 tons.<ref name=Conways1860>Chesnau, Roger and Kolesnik, Eugene (Ed.) Conway's All the World's Fighting Ships 1860–1905. Conway Maritime Press, 1979. </ref>
  (1892) – hulked 1911.
  (1892) – stricken 1911.
  6,681 tons.
  (1893) – stricken 1922.
  (1892) – stricken 1920.
 

Germany

  (1890)
 
 
 
 
 
 
  (1896)
 
 

India

  (1870)
 
  (half-sister to Cerberus & Magdala)

British Colony of Victoria
 
 

The Netherlands

  (1894)
 
 
 
  (1900)
 
 
 
 
 
 

Norway

  (1897)
 
 
  (1899)
 
 
  (1914) – Both ships were requisitioned by the Royal Navy during World War I while under construction, completed and served as the monitors  and 
 
 

Russia

  (1865)
 Novgorod class (1874) – later reclassified as "Coastal Defence Armour-Clad Ships"
 
 
  (1895)
 
 
  - Captured by Japan in 1905, served in Imperial Japanese Navy until 1922.

Sweden

  (1886)
 Svea Göta Thule  (1896)
 Oden Thor Niord  (1900)
  (1902)
 
 
 
 
 Oscar II (1905)
  (1917)
 
 
 

Thailand

 
 Ratanakosin Sukhothai''
  (1938)

See also
 List of coastal defence ships of the Second World War

Notes

References

External links

 
Ship types